The 2017 Special Olympic World Winter Games officially called 11th Special Olympics World Winter Games is a Special Olympics, a multi-sports event that was held in Austria from March 14 through March 25, 2017.

Overview

It was announced in 2012 that the host city for the 2017 Special Olympics World Winter Games would be Graz and Schladming in Styria, Austria.

The opening and closing ceremonies were broadcast in the United States on ABC and ESPN. Most events were played live or re-aired on ESPN, ESPN2 and ESPNNEWS throughout the games.

The games

Reception
With 113 nations participating all were invited to the Official Reception in Vienna after the teams arrived. At the Reception teams and nations could meet other athletes, take photos and talk to media from all over the world. This first Special Olympics World Games had ever done. The Reception took place on March 16, 2017, at the Vienna, Rathaus.

Arrivals

Most athletes arrived at Vienna International Airport on March 14, 2017, and were given Special Austria 2017 necklaces and gear for their stay.

The teams from Ghana and Afghanistan were denied visas to travel to Austria to compete. The grounds for denial conveyed to the Ghana team were that Austria believed that the athletes would not return to Ghana after the competition. Tim Shriver, chairman of the board of Special Olympics International, said: "On paper, six athletes of more than 2,500 did not attend the 2017 World Games. But for those six, it is a nightmare."

Opening ceremony
The opening ceremony was on March 18, 2017. The games were officially opened by Alexander Van der Bellen. Jason Mraz and Grace VanderWaal, with a choir of children from Schladming and Special Olympics global messengers, performed "I Won't Give Up."  Helene Fischer performed "Fighter".

Nations participating
<onlyinclude> Host nation

Events
The following events are taking place at Austria 2017:

Calendar

Broadcasting
The 2017 World Games was broadcast on the following broadcasters in the following country:
  – ORF
  – ESPN Brasil
  – TSN2, Sportsnet
  – Sky Television
  – BBC
  – ESPN, ESPN2, ABC
  – ESPN

References

External links
Official Website

Special Olympics